NorthBay biz is a four color business-to-business magazine covering Napa, Marin and Sonoma counties. It was started in 1975 as Sonoma Business magazine. It is headquartered in Santa Rosa, California.  The owners of the magazine were Joni and Norman Rosinski and John Dennis from June 2000 to November 2017. They renamed the magazine following their acquisition in 2000.

The magazine publishes 16 times a year. 12 monthly issues and 4 bonus issues: a special wine issue, The NorthBay biz 500 (a complete listing of the top 500 companies in the North Bay) and a "Best of" issue (a readers poll of the best businesses in the North Bay). It was acquired by Amaturo Sonoma Media Group in November 2017.

The February 2021 issue contained an inflammatory "guest column" by Sandy Metzger (a contributor to the magazine) titled "Is Systemic Oppression Real?" that members of the North Bay community described as "toxic and unbelievably offensive", "a racist diatribe", and "giving white supremacy a platform".

References

External links
 NorthBay Biz History
 Issues available through the Sonoma County Library

1975 establishments in California
Business magazines published in the United States
Local interest magazines published in the United States
Listings magazines
Magazines established in 1975
Magazines published in the San Francisco Bay Area
Mass media in Santa Rosa, California